Vân Sơn may refer to:

Places in Vietnam
 , a rural commune of Tân Lạc District
 , a rural commune of Sơn Dương District
 Vân Sơn, Bắc Giang, a rural commune of Sơn Động District
 , a rural commune of Triệu Sơn District

People
Van Son (surname)
Van Son (cyclist) (born 1934), Cambodian cyclist
Vân Sơn (comedian) (born 1961), Vietnamese comedian, founder of Van Son Entertainment